The following railroads operate in the U.S. state of South Dakota.

Current freight carriers
BNSF Railway (BNSF)
Canadian Pacific Railway (CP) through subsidiaries Dakota, Minnesota and Eastern Railroad (DME) and Soo Line Railroad (SOO)
D&I Railroad (DAIR)
Dakota, Missouri Valley and Western Railroad (DMVW)
Dakota Southern Railway (DSRC)
Ellis and Eastern Company (EE)
Ringneck & Western (RWRR)
Sisseton Milbank Railroad (SMRR) - subsidiary of Twin Cities and Western Railroad
Sunflour Railroad (SNR)
Rapid City, Pierre and Eastern Railroad (RCPE)

Passenger carriers
Black Hills Central Railroad
Prairie Village, Herman and Milwaukee Railroad

Defunct railroads

Notes

References
Association of American Railroads (2003), Railroad Service in South Dakota (PDF). Retrieved May 11, 2005.

South Dakota
Railroads